National Hansen's Disease Museum may refer to:

 U.S. National Hansen's Disease Museum, within the Carville Historic District
 National Hansen's Disease Museum (Japan)

Medical museums
Leprosy